Our Little Family is an American reality television series that premiered on the TLC cable network, on February 17, 2015. But was shown again on November 17, 2018. The series revolves around the Hamill family: a family of five that live with dwarfism. The family consists of parents Dan and Michelle, their son Jack, and fraternal twins CeCe and Cate.

Episodes

Series overview

Season 1 (2015)

Season 2 (2015)

Season 3 (2018)

References

External links

 

2010s American reality television series
2015 American television series debuts
2015 American television series endings
English-language television shows
Television series about families
Works about dwarfism
TLC (TV network) original programming